Patrich Steve Wanggai (born 27 June 1988 in Nabire) is an Indonesian professional footballer who plays as a forward for Liga 2 club Persipura Jayapura. He has a lethal left foot and good aerial positioning when crossing.

Personal life 
His older brother, Izaac Wanggai and his cousin, Imanuel Wanggai, are also a football player.

Club career 
He start his football career with Persewon Wondama and Perseman Manokwari. He started his professional career with Persidafon Dafonsoro along with his older brother Izaac Wanggai before he move to Persipura Jayapura.

Sriwijaya 
In November 2014, he signed with Indonesia Super League club Sriwijaya. Wanggai made his league debut on 4 April 2015 in a match against Pelita Bandung Raya at the Gelora Sriwijaya Stadium, Palembang.

Karketu Dili 
In early 2016 while the Indonesian league was suspended Wanggai joined Karketu Dili in the Liga Futebol Amadora in Timor-Leste. He became league top scorer with 10 goals in 2016 seasons and bring the club finished as runner-up that season.

Madura United 
In August 2016 Wanggai signed with Madura United.

Borneo 
In 2017, Wanggai signed a year contract with Liga 1 club Borneo. He made his league debut on 13 August 2017 in a match against PS TNI. On 8 November 2017, Wanggai scored his first goal for Borneo against Persib Bandung in the 45th minute at the Mulawarman Stadium, Bontang.

Sriwijaya 
In January 2018 Wanggai returned and signed with Sriwijaya for the 2018 Liga 1. He made his league debut on 25 March 2018 in a match against Borneo. On 12 May 2018, Wanggai scored his first goal for Sriwijaya against Bhayangkara in the 86th minute at the Gelora Sriwijaya Stadium, Palembang. He made 10 league appearances and scored two goals for Sriwijaya, before being released on a free transfer during the mid-season transfer window.

Persib Bandung 
After being released by Sriwijaya, Persib Bandung immediately signed Wanggai on a free transfer during the mid-season transfer window. He made his league debut on 22 July 2018 in a match against Barito Putera. On 30 July 2018, Wanggai scored his first goal for Persib against PS TIRA in the 45th minute at the Sultan Agung Stadium, Bantul.

Kalteng Putra 
In 2019 Wanggai signed with Kalteng Putra for the 2019 Liga 1. Wanggai made his debut on 16 May 2019 in a match against PSIS Semarang. On 26 July 2019, Wanggai scored his first goal for Kalteng Putra against TIRA-Persikabo in the 88th minute at the Pakansari Stadium, Bogor. He made 27 league appearances and scored seven goals for Kalteng Putra.

Persebaya Surabaya 
He was signed for Persebaya Surabaya to play in Liga 1 in the 2020 season. Wanggai made his debut on 29 February 2020 in a match against Persik Kediri at the Gelora Bung Tomo Stadium, Surabaya. This season was suspended on 27 March 2020 due to the COVID-19 pandemic. The season was abandoned and was declared void on 20 January 2021.

PSM Makassar 
In 2021, Wanggai joined in the PSM Makassar squad for 2021 Menpora Cup. He made his debut with PSM Makassar against Persija Jakarta.

RANS Cilegon 
In 2021, Wanggai signed a contract with Indonesian Liga 2 club RANS Cilegon. He made his league debut on 28 September against Dewa United at the Gelora Bung Karno Madya Stadium, Jakarta. He only made five appearances with the club.

Sulut United 
On 5 November 2021, Wanggai moved to North Sulawesi and joined Liga 2 side Sulut United, along with Rendy Juliansyah, on a free transfer. He made his debut on 10 November 2021 in a match against Mitra Kukar. Wanggai scored his first goal in the 74th minute at the Batakan Stadium, Balikpapan.

International career 
Patrich Wanggai received and scored his first senior international cap against Philippines on 5 June 2012.

International goals 

|}

Honours

Club 
Persipura Jayapura
 Indonesia Super League: 2013
Sriwijaya
 East Kalimantan Governor Cup: 2018
Persebaya Surabaya
 East Java Governor Cup: 2020

International 
Indonesia U-23
 Southeast Asian Games  Silver medal: 2011

Individual 
 Liga Futebol Amadora Top Goalscorer: 2016 (10 goals)

References

External links 
 
 

1988 births
Living people
People from Nabire Regency
Indonesian Christians
Indonesian footballers
Indonesia international footballers
Indonesian Premier Division players
Liga 1 (Indonesia) players
Liga 2 (Indonesia) players
Perseman Manokwari players
Persidafon Dafonsoro players
Persipura Jayapura players
Terengganu F.C. II players
Sriwijaya F.C. players
Persib Bandung players
Kalteng Putra F.C. players
Persebaya Surabaya players
PSM Makassar players
RANS Nusantara F.C. players
Expatriate footballers in Malaysia
Indonesian expatriate sportspeople in Malaysia
Expatriate footballers in East Timor
Indonesian expatriate sportspeople in East Timor
Indonesian expatriate footballers
Malaysia Super League players
Indonesia youth international footballers
Association football forwards
Southeast Asian Games silver medalists for Indonesia
Southeast Asian Games medalists in football
Competitors at the 2011 Southeast Asian Games
Sportspeople from Papua